Yirrkala calyptra is an eel in the family Ophichthidae (worm/snake eels). It was described by John E. McCosker in 2011. It is a marine, tropical eel which is known from Queensland Australia, in the western Pacific Ocean.

The species epithet "calyptra", treated as a noun in apposition, means "veil" in Greek, and refers to the eel's facial colouring.

References

Ophichthidae
Fish described in 2011